Riccardo Pizzuti (born 28 May 1934) is an Italian actor and stuntman. He is known for playing the role of gunfighter Morton Clayton in the 1972 film Man of the East. Pizzuti appeared in They Call Me Trinity, and its sequel Trinity Is Still My Name. He often appeared in films featuring the actors Terence Hill and Bud Spencer, usually cast as a villain. He has also been credited as Rick Piper and Peter Whiteman.

Partial filmography 

 The Vengeance of Ursus (1961) – Fighter (uncredited)
 Agenti Segreti Contro: I tre nemici (1962) – Train Thug (uncredited)
 The Secret Mark of D'Artagnan (1962) – Officer (uncredited)
 A Queen for Caesar (1962) – Soldier (uncredited)
 D'Artagnan contro i 3 moschettieri (1963) – Tavern Fight Soldier (uncredited)
 The Black Duke (1963) – Soldier (uncredited)
 Spartacus and the Ten Gladiators (1964) – Roman Senator and Commander (uncredited)
 Revenge of The Gladiators (1964) – Gladiator (uncredited)
 Fire Over Rome (1965)
 Blood for a Silver Dollar (1965) – Soldier (uncredited)
 L'avventuriero della Tortuga (1965) – Pirate
 Degueyo (1966) – Tom (uncredited)
 Arizona Colt (1966) – Watch Henchman
 Fort Yuma Gold (1966) – Corporal Wilson
 Sugar Colt (1966) – Man in Saloon (uncredited)
 Django Shoots First (1966) – Cluster Henchman (uncredited)
 Blood at Sundown (1966) – Fighter in Bar (uncredited)
 Long Days of Vengeance (1967) – Bystander/Cobb Henchman (uncredited)
 Up the MacGregors! (1967) – Bandit
 Wanted (1967) – Mathias
 The Magnificent Texan (1967) – Jimmy Stark
 Any Gun Can Play (1967) – Paco
 Gunman Sent by God (1968) – Coleman Henchman (uncredited)
 Vengeance (1968) – Mendoza's Henchman (uncredited)
 Garter Colt (1968)
 May God Forgive You... But I Won't (1968) – Bearded Bounty Hunter (uncredited)
 Ace High (1968) – Harold Henchman
 Zorro the Fox (1968) – Don Julio
 The Nephews of Zorro (1968) – Lanciere
 The Battle of El Alamein (1969) – Jailbird (uncredited)
 God Will Forgive My Pistol (1969) – Pedro Ramirez (uncredited)
 The Specialists (1969) – Brawler (uncredited)
 The Price of Power (1969) – Deputy (uncredited)
 Quintana: Dead or Alive (1969) – Soldier (uncredited)
 Fighters from Ave Maria (1970) – Parker's Henchman (uncredited)
 Apocalypse Joe (1970) – Berg Henchman
 They Call Me Trinity (1970) – Jeff
 Day of Judgment (1971) – Man Killed at Waterfalls
 W Django! (1971) – Thompson
 Trinity Is Still My Name (1971) – Chief of the Dallas Gunmen
 Lady Frankenstein (1971) – The Creature
 It Can Be Done Amigo (1972) – Franciscus Gang Member (uncredited)
 Man of the East (1972) – Morton Clayton
 ... All the Way, Boys! (1972) – Naso
 Even Angels Eat Beans (1973) – The Cobra
 Battle of the Amazons (1973) – Medonte
 The Magnificent Dare Devil (1973) – Brauner's Driver (uncredited)
 Super Stooges vs. the Wonder Women (1974) – Philones
 Charleston (1974) – Maloney's Henchman
 Two Missionaries (1974) – Menendez's Henchman #1 (uncredited)
 White Fang to the Rescue (1974) – Dog Trainer
 Flatfoot in Hong Kong (1975) – Accardo's Thug (uncredited)
 Soldier of Fortune (1976) – Villeforte (uncredited)
 Keoma (1976) – Caldwell Gang Member #1
 Crime Busters (1977) – Fred's Henchman
 They Called Him Bulldozer (1978) – Soldier #1 (uncredited)
 Odds and Evens (1978) – Mancino
 The Sheriff and the Satellite Kid (1979) – Airman
 Flatfoot in Egypt (1980) – Salvatore Coppola
 Everything Happens to Me (1980) – First Woodcutter
 Buddy Goes West (1981) – Colorado Sim
 Who Finds a Friend Finds a Treasure (1981) – Hood (uncredited)
 Odd Squad (1981) – Soldier Dario Tognon
 Count Tacchia (1982) – Tomegaux
 Go for It (1983) – Mr. Spider
 Rush (1983) – Steel
 Speaking of the Devil (1991) – Joe the Taxi Driver
 Sons of Trinity (1995) – Gunslinger

References

External links 

Rotten Tomatoes profile

1934 births
Living people
People from Calabria
Italian male film actors
Italian stunt performers
Male Spaghetti Western actors
Male Western (genre) film actors
20th-century Italian male actors